Aetos ("Eagle") was an  which served in the Royal Hellenic Navy from 1912–1945.

Origin

Aetos was originally named San Luis.

Greek purchase

They were purchased in 1912 by Greece, ready for delivery, each for the sum of £148,000, when the Balkan Wars seemed likely.  The four ships were sailed with a non-Greek crew to Algiers, to meet the requisitioned personnel transport ship Ionia which contained the Greek crews for the ships.  When Aetos entered the Mediterranean she went adrift due to a serious engine breakdown. By pure coincidence one of the other destroyers passed nearby and towed Aetos to Algiers.

Service history
During the Balkan Wars, the Royal Hellenic Navy purchased only the minimum amount of ammunition. Torpedoes were not available for this class of ship, and for this reason these ships were initially named 'scouts' rather than 'destroyers'. She was under the command of Commander A. Douroutis, RHN.

During the First World War, Greece belatedly entered the war on the side of the Triple Entente. Due to Greece's neutrality, the four Aetos-class ships were seized by the Allies in October 1916, taken over by the French in November, and served in the French Navy from 1917-18. By 1918, they were back on escort duty under Greek colors, mainly in the Aegean Sea.

Aetos participated in the evacuation of Greeks from Russia during the Russian Civil War in 1918 and saw action in the Greco-Turkish War (1919-1922) in the Sea of Marmara and the Aegean Sea.

After the war, Aetos was extensively rebuilt by the J Samuel White yard from 1925–1927 and emerged as a much more modern unit.  Four Yarrow boilers replaced her five original units with 5 funnels reduced to two.  This allowed the bridge to be moved further aft reducing spray and allowed a deckhouse to be built forward of it for a super firing 4-inch gun.  One more gun between the funnels and one on the quarterdeck aft with two single Pom Pom's completed the gun armament.  Torpedo tubes were increased to 2 triple mounts and a Vickers director fire control as was fitted.

Aetos participated in the Second World War. After surviving the German invasion of Greece in April 1941, Aetos served under the operational control of the Royal Navy based in the Indian Ocean, where despite her age she served with distinction.  Further modifications included new anti-aircraft guns, and anti-submarine weapons.  After the end of the Second World War, Aetos was stricken in 1945.

See also
 History of the Hellenic Navy

References

Aetos-class destroyers
World War II destroyers of Greece
1911 ships
Ships built on the River Mersey